Bob Carlin (born March 17, 1953 in New York City) is an American old-time banjo player and singer.

Carlin performs primarily in the clawhammer style of banjo.  He has toured the United States, Canada, and Europe performing on various historical banjos (including gourd banjos), and has explored the African roots of the banjo by working with the Malian musician Cheick Hamala Diabate and the elder African American fiddler Joe Thompson. He is also one of the few musicians skilled in the performance of minstrel-style banjo songs of the mid-19th century. He also occasionally plays guitar.

For six years, Carlin toured throughout the United States, Canada, and Japan with John Hartford.

Carlin is a three-time winner of the late Frets Magazine readers' poll.  He has released four albums on Rounder Records as well as several instruction manuals and videos for the banjo.

With his brother Richard Carlin (also a musician, author and record producer, b. 1956), Bob co-authored "Southern Exposure: The Story of Southern Music in Pictures and Words" (Billboard Books 2000), for which John Hartford wrote the foreword.
 
Bob Carlin is the founder of CarTunes Recordings, and also works as a record producer.  He lives in Lexington, NC with his wife and son, Benjamin Morris 'Leonardo' Carlin.

References

External links
Bob Carlin official site
Bob Carlin Collection, Southern Folklife Collection, University of North Carolina at Chapel Hill
Bob Carlin Interview NAMM Oral History Library (2017)

1953 births
Musicians from New York City
Old-time musicians
American banjoists
Living people